Jennifer Lilley (born August 4, 1984) is an American actress and singer. Lilley played a supporting role in the 2011 film The Artist, temporarily portrayed Maxie Jones on the ABC soap opera General Hospital from September 2011 to August 2012, and has played the character of Theresa Donovan on NBC's soap opera Days of Our Lives from July 2013 to November 2016 and again from May to July 2018. She has also starred in several television films from Hallmark Channel.

Early life
Lilley was born in Roanoke, Virginia to Ellen and Vincent Lilley. She is the second oldest of four children.  She has two brothers, Michael and Ryan, and one sister, Katherine. Lilley graduated from Cave Spring High School. She went on to attend the University of Virginia and graduated early with magna cum laude honors.

Career

Acting
In 2011, Lilley had a supporting role in director Michel Hazanavicius's silent movie The Artist. She also appeared as Monie in the iCarly TV movie, "iParty with Victorious".

In the fall of 2011, Lilley took over the role of Maxie Jones, as a temporary recast for Kirsten Storms  on General Hospital while she was on medical leave for endometriosis. She made her on-screen debut on September 28, 2011. In August 2012, Lilley confirmed that she had finished taping and made her on-screen exit on August 20, 2012; Storms later returned on September 5.

In April 2013, Lilley joined the cast of Days of Our Lives as a newly created character. She made her on-screen debut as Theresa Donovan on July 3, 2013. In June 2016, she confirmed she was exiting the soap due to the demanding filming schedule hindering her ability to pursue other commitments and opportunities. Lilley reprised her portrayal as Theresa in May–July 2018.

In November 2016, Lilley appeared in a film for the Hallmark Channel titled A Dash of Love. In June of 2018, she played Charlotte in the Hallmark Channel film Yes, I Do, followed later that same year by playing Molly in the Hallmark Channel holiday film Mingle All the Way. In 2022, Lilley ended her association with Hallmark Channel, and signed a four-film deal with GAC Media, the owners of Great American Family channel.

Singing
In the summer of 2014, Lilley traveled to Georgia, where she hosted and sang in a benefit concert with SOWEGA Art Performance to raise funds for ONEless Ministries, and in December of the same year, sang at the 3rd Annual Westchester All Stars Christmas for Wounded Veterans Concert in New York.

On November 24, 2015, Lilley released her first Christmas album, "Tinsel Time".  The album's title track premiered on TV Guides TV Insider. On October 5, 2018, Lilley debuted her studio single, "King of Hearts" from her forthcoming album, Lilley.

Personal life
On May 26, 2007, Lilley married Jason Wayne. In 2016, Lilley and her husband became foster parents through the organization, Childhelp. In June 2019, Lilley and Wayne adopted their two foster sons and in July 2019, she gave birth to a daughter. In May 2022, Lilley gave birth to the couple's fourth child, another daughter.

Filmography

Film

Television

Awards and nominations

References

External links

 
 Jen Lilley on Disaster Date

1984 births
Actresses from Virginia
American film actresses
American soap opera actresses
American television actresses
Living people
People from Roanoke, Virginia
University of Virginia alumni
21st-century American women